The 2015–16 FA Vase is the 42nd season of the FA Vase, an annual football competition for teams playing below Step 4 of the English National League System.   The competition is to be played with two qualifying rounds preceding the six proper rounds, semi-finals (played over two legs) and final to be played at Wembley Stadium.  All ties before the semi-finals are played with extra-time if drawn, with penalty kicks if still drawn after extra-time in the return fixture (or after the first match if both clubs agree).  Therefore, all matches listed as draws were finished after extra time.

The winners were Morpeth Town, who beat Hereford 4–1 on 22 May at Wembley Stadium.

Calendar
The calendar for the 2015–16 FA Vase qualifying rounds, as announced by The Football Association.

First round qualifying

Notes:

Second round qualifying

First round proper

Second round proper

Third round proper

Fourth round proper

Fifth round proper

Quarter-finals

Semi-finals

Hereford won 3–1 on aggregate.

Morpeth Town won 4–3 on aggregate.

Final

References

FA Vase seasons
FA Vase
FA Vase